The Greek Women's Volleyball League is organised by Hellenic Volleyball Federation (Greek:Ελληνική Ομοσπονδία Πετοσφαίρισης). In 2021–22 championship took part 14 clubs.

Panathinaikos won the first championship in 1971. During the first decade, Panathinaikos and ZAON Kifissia dominated. Panathinaikos have won 24 championships so far, more than any other team.

Teams

The clubs for the 2021–22 season:

Group A

Group B

Title holders

 1970–71 Panathinaikos (1)
 1971–72 Panathinaikos (2)
 1972–73 Panathinaikos (3)
 1973–74 ZAON (1)
 1974–75 ZAON (2)
 1975–76 ZAON (3)
 1976–77 Panathinaikos (4)
 1977–78 Panathinaikos (5)
 1978–79 Panathinaikos (6)
 1979–80 ZAON (4)
 1980–81 ZAON (5)
 1981–82 Panathinaikos (7)
 1982–83 Panathinaikos (8)
 1983–84 Filathlitikos Thessaloniki (1)
 1984–85 Panathinaikos (9)
 1985–86 Filathlitikos Thessaloniki (2)
 1986–87 Filathlitikos Thessaloniki (3)
 1987–88 Panathinaikos (10)
 1988–89 Ionikos Nea Filadelfeia (1)
 1989–90 Panathinaikos (11)
 1990–91 Panathinaikos (12)
 1991–92 Panathinaikos (13)
 1992–93 Panathinaikos (14)
 1993–94 Ionikos Nea Filadelfeia (2)
 1994–95 Vrilissia (1)
 1995–96 Vrilissia (2)
 1996–97 Vrilissia (3)
 1997–98 Panathinaikos (15)
 1998–99 Vrilissia (4)
 1999–00 Panathinaikos (16)
 2000–01 Panellinios (1)
 2001–02 Panellinios (2)
 2002–03 Filathlitikos Thessaloniki (4)
 2003–04 Vrilissia (5)
 2004–05 Panathinaikos (17)
 2005–06 Panathinaikos (18)
 2006–07 Panathinaikos (19)
 2007–08 Panathinaikos (20)
 2008–09 Panathinaikos (21)
 2009–10 Panathinaikos (22)
 2010–11 Panathinaikos (23)
 2011–12 AEK (1)
 2012–13 Olympiacos (1)
 2013–14 Olympiacos (2)
 2014–15 Olympiacos (3)
 2015–16 Olympiacos (4)
 2016–17 Olympiacos (5)
 2017–18 Olympiacos (6)
 2018–19 Olympiacos (7)
 2019–20 Olympiacos (8)
 2020–21 no champion
 2021–22 Panathinaikos (24)

Performance by club

Sponsors and supporters
 Hellenic Broadcasting Corporation
 TrainOSE
 ANEK Lines
 Blue Star Ferries

See also
A1 Ethniki Men's Volleyball

References

External links
 Hellenic Volleyball Federation
  Greek A1 Etniki. women.volleybox.net 

Volleyball in Greece
Greece women1
Greece
Women's sports leagues in Greece
Volleyball
Professional sports leagues in Greece